Tingsten is a Swedish surname. Notable people with the surname include:

Lars Tingsten (1857–1937), Swedish Army general and Minister for War
Herbert Tingsten (1896–1973), Swedish political scientist, writer, and newspaper publisher

Swedish-language surnames